Evaristo Ribera Chevremont (February 16, 1890 in San Juan – March 1, 1976) was a poet from Puerto Rico. Although several of his published books deal with Puerto Rican nationality and regionalism, many of his verses excel in a universal lyrical character, as can be read in books such as El Caos de Los Sueños and El Hondero Lanzó la Piedra, among others.

Literary Styles
Ribera Chevremont is considered to be one of the great poets of the Antilles and mid-twentieth century critics such as Federico de Onís and Concha Meléndez even considered him one of the most important poets of the Spanish language.  Ribera Chevremont traveled to Spain several times and established friendly ties with some writers' circles. He was much admired for his prolific poetic gift, and several of his works were published in that country, as well as in Puerto Rico. He mastered several modern poetic techniques, such as Hispanoamerican Modernism, European Ultraism and Suprarealism. He wrote in free verse as well as in traditional forms, specifically, sonnets, which he mastered fully, as seen in Sonetos del Mar, del Amor, de la Soledad, de la Muerte, de Dios, among others. His last book to reach the public, Sonetos a Galicia, a book dedicated to the land of his father, was published posthumously in 1994 by the poet's widow, María Luisa Méndez de Chevremont and his daughter Iris Ribera-Chevremont Méndez, through the Xunta de Galicia in Spain.

Ribera Chevremont published his first volume of verse, Desfile Romántico, in 1914. In 1974, the poet published El Caos de los Sueños, a book of poems in free verse of a profound, lyrical and universal nature. In 1980, the University of Puerto Rico Press published a complete anthology of his poems in two large volumes, Evaristo Ribera Chevremont: Obra poetica Vol I & II. Besides that comprehensive collection, several poetry books have been posthumously published, such as Jinetes de la inmortalidad, El Libro de las Apologías, and Sonetos a Galicia.

Published books

Desfile Romántico, 1914
El Templo de los Alabastros, 1919
La Copa del Hebe, 1922
Los Almendros del Paseo Covadonga
Pajarera
La Hora del Orifice, 1929
Tierra y Sombra, 1930
Color 1938
Tonos y Formas, 1943
Barro, 1945
Anclas de Oro, 1945
Tú, Mar, Yo y Ella, 1946
Verbo, 1947
El Niño de Arcilla, 1950
Creación, 1951
La llama Pensativa, 1954
Inefable Orilla, 1961
Memorial de Arena, 1962
Punto Final (Poemas del Sueño y de la Muerte)
Principio de Canto, 1965
El Semblante
Rió Volcado 1968
Canto de mi Tierra
El Caos de los Sueños 1974
El Hondero Lanzó la Piedra, 1975
El Libro de las Apologías, 1976 (Posthumous)
Jinetes de la Inmortalidad, 1977 (Posthumous)
Elegías a San Juan, 1980 (Posthumous)
Obra Poética, Vol I, 1980
Obra Poética, Vol II, 1980
Sonetos a Galicia, 1994(Posthumous)

Critical Bibliography

Melendez, Concha; La inquietud sosegada : poética de Evaristo Chevremont ;Editorial Imprenta Soltero, San Juan (Puerto Rico), 1956
Marxuach, Carmen Irene; Evaristo Ribera Chevremont : voz de vanguardia; Editorial Universidad de Puerto Rico, 1987
González, José Emilio, "La Poesía de Evaristo Ribera Chevrmont", Evaristo Ribera Chevremont:Obra Poética, Universidad de Puerto Rico, 1980
de Onís, Federico, Antología Poetica, 1924–1950, Universidad de Puerto Rico, San Juan 1957
Guillén, Jorge, "Carta a Evaristo Ribera Chevremont", in Principio de Canto, Editorial Venezuela, San Juan, 1965
Gallego, Laura, "Las Ideas Literarias de Evaristo Ribera Chevremont", Instituto de Cultura Puertorriqueña

See also

List of Puerto Ricans
French immigration to Puerto Rico
List of Puerto Rican writers
Puerto Rican literature

References

External links
Evaristo Ribera Chevremont;Bio and Poems
https://web.archive.org/web/20080415162505/http://www.lapoesiademariana.com/EvaristoRiveraChevremont.html; Biography
https://web.archive.org/web/20110720134214/http://absysnet.cervantes.es/abnetopac02/abnetcl.exe/O7009/ID4a430244/NT1; Instituto Cervantes, NYC
http://www.library.nd.edu/rarebooks/collections/rarebooks/hispanic/lit_caribbean.shtml; U. Notre Dame Library, The Hispanic Caribbean Literature
https://web.archive.org/web/20080221212415/http://members.fortunecity.es/mundopoesia/autores/evaristo_ribera_chevremont.htm; Ribera Chevremont

Burials at Santa María Magdalena de Pazzis Cemetery
Puerto Rican poets
Puerto Rican male writers
1890s births
1976 deaths
Puerto Rican people of Galician descent
People from San Juan, Puerto Rico
20th-century American poets
20th-century American male writers